Roberto Mauro Cantoro (born 1 September 1976 in Ramos Mejia, La Matanza Partido, Argentina), nicknamed El Toro, is an Argentine footballer, who plays for León de Huánuco.

He also has Italian and Polish citizenships.

Personal life
Having previously gained Italian citizenship, after several years spent in Poland, he gained Polish citizenship in 2008 at the age of 31. His maternal grandfather, Bazyli Wolczak, born 1901, emigrated to Argentina from Galicja at the age of 14.

He married Adrianna, a woman he met in 1990 on a beach in Mar de la Plata. He has two sons; Mauro and Tiago, who both were born and grew up in Poland.

He is fluent in Polish, Spanish, Portuguese, and Italian.

Club career 

Cantoro started his career at Club Atlético Vélez Sársfield in the Primera Division Argentina in 1994. After three years of limited appearances in the first team he moved to Atlético Rafaela of the Argentine 2nd division for the Clausura 1997 season.

In 1998 and 1999, Cantoro played for Universitario de Deportes of Peru before having short spells with Club Blooming of Bolivia and Ascoli in Italy. He joined Wisła Kraków in 2001, where he became one of the most widely recognised players in the country, and a club icon.

He then joined struggler's Odra Wodzisław in 2010 after leaving Wisła in 2009, however his stay was short lived.

He returned to South America  as his career nears its end, where he played for several Argentine lower division clubs. However, he then moved to Peru, where he played for several top-flight clubs.

International career 

Cantoro played in U-17 Argentina national football team in World Cup 1993. After receiving a Polish passport in 2007, he was contender to be called up to the national squad, however he was never called up in the end, partly due to the fact he had an appearance in the Argentine U-17's.

Honours

Universitario de Deportes 

 Primera División Peruana Apertura: 1998
 Primera División Peruana: 1998, 1999

Wisła Kraków 

 Ekstraklasa: 2002–03, 2003–04, 2004–05, 2007–08, 2008–09
 Polish Cup: 2001–02, 2002–03

Individual

 Ekstraklasa Midfielder of the Year: 2004

References

External links
 
 

1976 births
Living people
Association football midfielders
Argentine footballers
Club Atlético Vélez Sarsfield footballers
Club Universitario de Deportes footballers
Club Blooming players
Atlético de Rafaela footballers
Wisła Kraków players
Ekstraklasa players
Argentine Primera División players
Argentine expatriate footballers
Expatriate footballers in Peru
Argentine expatriate sportspeople in Poland
Expatriate footballers in Bolivia
Argentine expatriate sportspeople in Peru
Expatriate footballers in Poland
Argentine expatriate sportspeople in Bolivia
Argentine expatriate sportspeople in Italy
Argentina youth international footballers
Argentine people of Italian descent
Polish people of Argentine descent
Polish people of Italian descent
Naturalized citizens of Poland
Citizens of Italy through descent